Groeslon (Welsh: Y Groeslon, "the crossroads") is a small village in the community of Llandwrog in the Welsh traditional county of Caernarfonshire.  Groeslon is administered by Gwynedd Council.
 The population was 880 at the 2011 census

Nearby villages are Penygroes, Carmel and Dinas. The village lies approximately five miles south of Caernarfon. It has one primary school in the centre of the village and no secondary schools. Most secondary school age pupils go to Ysgol Dyffryn Nantlle in Penygroes.

Groeslon was by-passed in 2002 by the A487 road, a trunk road which cost around £12 million to complete. A bat bridge was constructed in 2010 to guide lesser horseshoe bats across the road.

Formerly an agricultural and slate mining village, Groeslon is now expanding as a commuter village for the surrounding towns, especially Caernarfon and Bangor. Its initial growth came as a result of the construction of the LMS railway in 1867. Groeslon railway station closed in December 1964. The railway line is now part of the national cycle route.

In the village there is one pub called the Penionyn.

At the bottom of the village, bordering the A487, a huge wall becomes visible. This is the wall to the Glynllifon estate, formerly the seat of Lord Newborough, which is now a country park and college (Meirion Dwyfor) specialising in land based industries, e.g. agriculture, equine studies and arboriculture.

Groeslon is covered by a Neighbourhood Policing Team based in Penygroes.

Governance
An electoral ward in the same name exists. This ward extends beyond the confines of Groeslon Community and the total population taken at the 2011 Census was 1,695.

Notable residents
Welsh author Eirug Wyn until his death in 2004.
The dramatist John Gwilym Jones (1904–1988)
Poet Tom Huws.
Llion Iwan, Welsh documentary journalist/producer and author.
 'The Laughing Postman' Arwel Jones.
Novelist Menna Medi

Bibliography
Hanes Y Groeslon (History of Groeslon) available from public libraries:

References

External links

Dyffryn Nantlle website (with section on Groeslon, including postcards and photos)
www.geograph.co.uk : photos of Groeslon and surrounding area

Villages in Gwynedd
Llandwrog